Jhansi Airstrip  is a military airstrip situated in Jhansi city in the Bundelkhand region of Indian state of Uttar Pradesh, which is run by the Army Aviation Corps and owned by Uttar Pradesh Government. The airstrip covers an area of 198 acres. Establishment of an airport was proposed by government by upgrading the existing government airstrip, which is now replaced by a new greenfield airport project.

History 
Jhansi airport was handed over by the DGCA to the National Airports Authority in 1986. The airport was then handed over for maintenance to the UP Government. In 1990, the State Government handed over the air field to the Indian Army.

Extension plan
The Uttar Pradesh government has prepared a blueprint to expand and develop Jhansi airport to open up the backward Bundelkhand region for tourism. Its development as a civil airport would facilitate easy access to Khajuraho (150 km away in Madhya Pradesh) and boost to tourism in and around Jhansi, which is the nerve centre of Bundelkhand. The airstrip has existed from the British days and is largely used for military purposes. the clearances for development of the airstrip into a full-fledged airport has been given by highest level in the state. 
Through Reigional connectivity scheme soon a Jhansi-Lucknow flight will start.

Lucknow-Jhansi route was selected under UDAN 2,but flight operations have not commenced yet.
Jhansi-Agra and Jhansi-Khajuraho routes have been suggested for UDAN 3 by the government.

New Airport
In December 2021, Amar Ujala newspaper reported that extension plans are replaced by a new Greenfield Airport proposal.

See also
 Lucknow International Airport
 Varanasi International Airport
 Noida International Airport
 Kanpur Airport
 Allahabad Airport
 Ayodhya Airport
 Sultanpur Airport

References

External links 

Indian Air Force bases
Airports in Uttar Pradesh
Proposed airports in Uttar Pradesh
Transport in Jhansi
Buildings and structures in Jhansi